Sheshtanrud may refer to:
 Sheshtanrud-e Bala
 Sheshtanrud-e Pain